GS Staalwerken Stadion is a multi-use stadium in Helmond, Netherlands. It is currently used mostly for football matches and is the home stadium of Helmond Sport. The stadium is able to hold 4,142 people and was built in 1967.

References

Helmond Sport
Braak
Sports venues in North Brabant